Jacobus Petrus Engelbrecht (born 8 March 1987) is a South African athlete specialising in the shot put. He has won several medals on continental level. In addition, he represented his country at the 2014 World Indoor Championships without qualifying for the final.

His personal bests in the event are 20.45 metres outdoors (Stellenbosch 2015) and 17.59 metres indoors (Sopot 2014).

Competition record

References

External links
Official website

1987 births
Living people
South African male shot putters
World Athletics Championships athletes for South Africa
Athletes (track and field) at the 2015 African Games
African Games silver medalists for South Africa
African Games medalists in athletics (track and field)
African Games bronze medalists for South Africa